Ognevia longipennis is a species of spur-throated grasshopper in the family Acrididae. It is found in the Palearctic.

References

External links

 

Melanoplinae
Insects described in 1910